Nyngan is a town in the centre of New South Wales, Australia, in the Bogan Shire local government area within the Orana Region of central New South Wales. At the 2016 census, Nyngan had a population of 1,988 people. The Barrier Highway starts at Nyngan, and runs west to Cobar and on through Wilcannia and Broken Hill into South Australia.

Nyngan Airport is a small airport just north of the town centre. Nyngan also lies on the Main Western railway line of New South Wales but is no longer served by passenger trains. The line remains open to freight traffic.

History
The district was originally inhabited by the Wangaibon Peoples. Thomas Mitchell explored the Bogan River in 1835, camping on the future townsite. He recorded the local Aboriginal word nyingan, said to mean 'long pond of water', though other meanings have been put forward, such as mussel or crayfish. Squatters had settled in Mitchell's wake before he had begun his return journey.
The town flourished after completion of the railway line in 1883.

The little town of Canonba, 25 kilometres to the north-east on Duck Creek, is part of the history of Nyngan. From the early 1840s until the middle 'eighties, it grew and flourished, servicing Canonba Station and other properties, and Cobb and Co. travellers. In the early 1880s there were about four hotels, three or four banks, various stores and tradesmen, a police station, a telegraph and money-order office, and representatives of churches. The Western Railway by-passed Canonba, and where it crossed the Bogan was Nyngan. The Canonba populace, goods and public institutions then all moved to Nyngan. By 1890 it was practically empty.

The Municipality of Nyngan was proclaimed on 17 February 1891 with Nyngan having a population of 1355.

The 1990 Nyngan flood
In April 1990, unusually heavy rains (which had caused flooding in Charleville, Queensland with total damages of up to $300 million) caused major flooding in the town, despite a massive effort by local people to raise the levee walls using sandbags. With the town almost completely flooded, all the residents had to be evacuated by helicopter from the railway station, the highest point of the town, which was not flooded. Air Force helicopters, TV news helicopters and private helicopters all co-operated in the airlift. The total damage amounted to $50 million. The airlift is commemorated by an Army helicopter placed outside of the Nyngan Railway Station. The railway station now houses a museum which includes exhibits relating to the 1990 flood. (The station had not been regularly used for train passengers since about 1980; the railway line to Bourke has been out of use since 17 May 1989 but the Cobar line remains open to carry ore and wheat).

Climate 
Nyngan experiences a hot semi-arid climate (Köppen: BSh, Trewartha: BShl), with very hot summers and mild winters.

Heritage listings 
Nyngan has a number of heritage-listed sites, including:

 Cemetery Road: Chinese Graves and Burner at Nyngan Cemetery
 77-79 Cobar Street: Nyngan Court House

Solar power

It was the largest solar PV plant in Australia when launched in July 2016.

Gallery

References

External links

Towns in New South Wales
Central West (New South Wales)
Bogan Shire
Nyngan, New South Wales
Main Western railway line, New South Wales